Attikaite is a copper calcium aluminum arsenate mineral with the chemical formula CaCuAl(AsO)(OH)·2HO. It was named after Attica Prefecture, where it was first identified.

References

External links 

 Attikaite data sheet
 Attikaite on the Handbook of Mineralogy

Copper(II) minerals
Calcium minerals
Aluminium minerals
Arsenate minerals
Hydroxide minerals